Emil Lang (1909–1944) was a World War II fighter ace.

Emil Lang may also refer to:

 Emil Lang (Robotech), fictional character in Robotech universe
Emil Lang, fictional character in Son of Frankenstein